2015 NCAA All-American may refer to:
2015 NCAA Men's Basketball All-Americans
2015 College Baseball All-America Team
2015 College Football All-America Team